The Canadian Journal of Human Sexuality (CJHS) is a peer-reviewed, scholarly journal  focusing on the medical, psychological, social, and educational aspects of human sexuality.  It is the official journal of the Sex Information and Education Council of Canada (SIECAN). The Editor-in-Chief of CJHS is Terry Humphreys. CJHS is published by University of Toronto Press.

References

External links 
 Official Site for The Canadian Journal of Human Sexuality
 Official Site of the Sex Information and Education Council of Canada

University of Toronto Press academic journals
Sexology journals
Quarterly magazines published in Canada
Quarterly journals
English-language journals
Academic journals associated with learned and professional societies of Canada
1992 establishments in Canada
Publications established in 1992